Windflower may refer to:

Plants
Anemone, a genus of plants in the buttercup family, Ranunculaceae
Anemonoides nemorosa, a species of flowering plant
The flower Adonis turns into after having been torn to pieces by a boar in Ovid's "Venus and Adonis"
Pulsatilla, a genus of plants in the buttercup family, Ranunculaceae

Music
Windflower, a piano composition by American pianist John Burke from the 2016 album Orogen
Windflower, a record by Herb Ellis & Remo Palmier (1978)
"Wind Flower", the lead single from K-pop girl group Mamamoo's EP Blue;s
"Windflowers", a song by Seals and Crofts from the 1974 album Unborn Child

Other uses
Windflower (novel) (La Rivière sans repos), a 1970 novel by Canadian author Gabrielle Roy
HMCS Windflower, a 1940 Royal Canadian Navy Flower-class corvette
HMS Windflower, British Royal Navy ships
Windflower, a 2006 novel written by Nick Bantock
Windflowers, a 1902 painting of John William Waterhouse
Sir Edward Elgar's private name for Alice Stuart-Wortley; see Elgar's Violin Concerto

See also
Wildflower (disambiguation)